The South Asian American Digital Archive (SAADA) is a 501(c)(3) not-for-profit organization that archives materials associated with the history of South Asian Americans.

History
SAADA was established in 2008 to preserve, document, and share the relatively unknown history of the South Asian American experience. SAADA is the only digital repository for materials related to the South Asian community in the United States. SAADA's digital-only approach to archives presents a major re-conceptualization of traditional archival functions. In this innovative, post-custodial approach to archives, original archival documents remain with the institutions or individuals from which they originate, while digital access copies are available online. In the summer of 2012, the archive added a visual browsing mode, allowing visitors to browse the archive without needing to choose any certain subject, source, time period, etc.

Organizational structure
SAADA is a 501(c)3 recognized not-for-profit organization registered in Illinois. Financial support is provided primarily through individual donations with some grant funding. During the summer of 2012, SAADA launched a fundraising campaign entitled "Foundation for the Future". The campaign's purpose is to create a sustainable organization to raise awareness and preserve the historical and cultural stories of the South Asian American community.

Members of the SAADA Board of Directors are: 
 Pawan Dhingra [President]
 Sindya Bhanoo [Secretary]
 Nidhi Kohli [Treasurer]
 Emily McNish
 Seema Sohi
Arun Venugopal

Collections

SAADA's Collection Development Policy defines South Asian American to include all those who trace their heritage to Bangladesh, India, Nepal, Pakistan, Sri Lanka, and the many South Asian diaspora communities across the globe. The archive collects digital files of materials in all formats that relate to the diverse history of South Asians in the United States, including written documents, newspapers, photographs, audio and video recordings, oral histories, pamphlets, websites, and digital files.

 Pre-1965 immigrants and visitors
 The Bellingham Riots
 South Asian American political involvement and activism
 Professional associations and labor organizations
 Regional and community organizations
 Religious organizations and places of worship
 Community newspapers
 Student organizations
 Prominent South Asian American artists, filmmakers, writers, musicians and intellectuals

Current SAADA collections include materials about Dalip Singh Saund, the first congressperson of Indian heritage, the Gadar Party, Fazlur Rahman Khan, Bhai Bhagwan Sing Gyanee and the Kerala Catholic Association of Southeast Michigan.

Projects
From the archive, SAADA has launched several projects to promote visual art and oral histories within the South Asian American community. 
Where We Belong: Artists in the Archive is SAADA project supported by the Pew Center for Arts & Heritage. This project aims to organize a cohort of South Asian artists for a year long dialogue on how to use art and the archives to fight against symbolic erasure of immigrant and minority communities. The artists involved in the Where We Belong Project include Rudresh Mahanthappa, Chiraag Bhakta, Joti Singh, Chitra Ganesh, and Zain Alam. 
The First Days Project is a SAADA project launched in 2013 that aims to collect and share stories of immigrants' first experiences in the United States. The website presents oral and written histories of immigrants' stories of what their first days were like in the United States. The First Days Project collects stories from all immigrant communities and currently has around 300 stories in its collection. 
Tides is the SAADA's online magazine that publishes stories based on materials from the archive. The magazine intends to showcase the diversity of experiences in the South Asian American community. 
Our Stories: An Introduction to South Asian America is a forthcoming book that will be published by SAADA. The book is meant to serve as an introduction to South Asian American history with essays about South Asian American experience. The book is authored by scholars of South Asian American history in collaboration with artists, activists, and practitioners.

Awards
The First Days Project was awarded Roy Rosenzweig Prize Recipient by the American Historical Association in 2015.  
SAADA was awarded the Philip M. Hamer–Elizabeth Hamer Kegan Award by the Society of American Archivists in 2016.

See also
 Densho
 Digital Library of India
 Nehru Memorial Museum & Library
 Panjab Digital Library
 Tamil Heritage Foundation

References

Further reading
 The New York Times, "American Roots of the Indian Independence Movement" (8/14/2012).
 The Sunday Guardian, "Sepia Shades of Immigrant History" (7/1/2012).
 APA Compass Radio, "Interview with Samip Mallick" (4/6/2012): Listen online
 Sepia Mutiny, "Digital Diaspora: The South Asian American Digital Archive" (8/1/2011).
 Asia Pacific Forum, "Interview with Samip Mallick" (7/11/2011): Listen online

South Asian American organizations
Indian-American history
Indian diaspora in the United States
Pakistani-American history
Bangladeshi-American culture
Charities based in Pennsylvania
Organizations established in 2008
Archives in the United States
American digital libraries